XHEPL-FM/XEPL-AM is a radio station on 91.3 FM and 550 AM in Ciudad Cuautémoc, Chihuahua, Mexico. The station is owned by the Moreno Salinas family and carries a variety format known as La Super Estación.

History
XHEPL began as XEPL-AM 550. The station was owned by Adolfo Moreno Cortés when it received its concession on July 23, 1970.

It migrated to FM in 2011.

References

Radio stations in Chihuahua
Radio stations in Mexico with continuity obligations